Delta Profronde was a single-day road bicycle race held annually in June in Zeeland, Netherlands. In 2005, the race was organized as a 1.1 event on the UCI Europe Tour. It was previously known as Ronde van Midden-Zeeland and it was an amateur race between 1959 and 1973. In 2008, the organizers of the Delta Profronde and of the OZ Wielerweekend operated a fusion to create the stage race Delta Tour Zeeland.

Winners

References

External links
Official Website 

Cycle races in the Netherlands
UCI Europe Tour races
Recurring sporting events established in 1959
1959 establishments in the Netherlands
Cycling in Zeeland